Macrosaccus is a genus of moths in the family Gracillariidae.

Etymology
The generic name is derived from the ancient Greek μακρο- (meaning long) and σάκκος (meaning bag) in reference to the elongate saccus in the male genitalia.

Species
There are six species currently recognized:
Macrosaccus coursetiae Eiseman & Davis, 2017
Macrosaccus gliricidius Davis, 2011
Macrosaccus morrisella (Fitch, 1859)
Macrosaccus neomexicanus Davis, 2011
Macrosaccus robiniella (Clemens, 1859)
Macrosaccus uhlerella (Fitch, 1859)

References

Lithocolletinae
Gracillarioidea genera

Taxa named by Donald R. Davis (entomologist)
Taxa named by Jurate de Prins